Hans M. Heybroek (born 1927, Bussum, died 2022, Wassenaar) was a Dutch botanist best known for his research into the genus Ulmus at the Dorschkamp Research Institute for Forestry & Landscape Planning. Until his retirement in 1992, he was responsible for the raising and release of numerous elm hybrid cultivars, notably 'Columella'. Specializing in phytopathology, Heybroek also investigated the Coral Spot fungus Nectria cinnabarina in elm. In 1960 he travelled to the Kashmir to search for a frost-hardy form of the Himalayan Elm Ulmus wallichiana as a source of anti-fungal genes for use in the Dutch elm research programme.

Publications 
Aims and criteria in elm breeding in the Netherlands. In H. Gerhold et al., eds. (1966). Breeding pest-resistant trees. Pages 387–389. Pergammon Press, Oxford.
Iep of olm, karakterboom van de Lage Landen (:Elm, a tree with character of the Low Countries), (with Goudzwaard, L, Kaljee, H.) (2009). KNNV, Uitgeverij. . 
The Dutch elm breeding program. Dutch Elm Disease Research, Chapter 3, in Sticklen & Sherald, Eds. (1993). Springer Verlag, New York, USA.
Elms of the Himalaya (co-author R. Melville). Kew Bulletin Vol. 26(1), 1971, London. 
Resistant Elms for Europe. In Burdekin, D. A. (Ed.) Research on Dutch elm disease in Europe. For. Comm. Bull. 60. pp 108 – 113. 1983.

References

External links 

1927 births
Living people
Dendrologists
20th-century Dutch botanists
Dutch phytopathologists
People from Bussum
Wageningen University and Research alumni
Academic staff of Wageningen University and Research